David Wilkie may refer to:
 David Wilkie (artist) (1785–1841), Scottish painter
 David Wilkie (surgeon) (1882–1938), British surgeon, scientist and philanthropist
 David Wilkie (footballer) (1914–2011), Australian rules footballer
 David Wilkie (swimmer) (born 1954), Scottish swimmer
 David Wilkie (ice hockey) (born 1974), American ice hockey player
 David Wilkie (taxicab driver) (1949–1984), Welsh taxi driver killed during the UK miners' strike of 1984–85
 Adam Purple, American activist and guerrilla gardener born as David Lloyd Wilkie